M-311 is a  state trunkline highway in Calhoun County in the US state of Michigan that runs from the intersection of M-60 in Burlington north to Interstate 94 (I-94) at exit 104 in Emmett Township.  It was previously an unsigned state trunkline, meaning that no reassurance markers were used to identify the highway.  The route mainly consists of 11 Mile Road, which was a county road prior to the 1998 rationalization process.

Route description

M-311 follows 11 Mile Road between M-60 and I-94. In the village of Burlington, M-311 is known as Marshall Street. There is a jog in 11 Mile Road as it runs northwesterly between Q Drive and O Drive. At N Drive, M-311/11 Mile Road turns along N Drive a short distance before turning back northward. Near D Drive, 11 Mile Road passes  Hyde Lake. M-311 crosses the Kalamazoo River just south of I-94. All of M-311 is two-lane, rural highway in forest lands and farm fields, and none of it is listed on the National Highway System.

History
M-311 was created on October 1, 1998, as a part of Governor John Engler's Rationalization process. The original routing started at BL I-94/Michigan Avenue and Raymond Avenue. It followed Raymond Avenue to Emmet Street before turning east to Cooper Avenue. From Cooper Avenue, M-311 turned east again on N Drive North until meeting 11 Mile Road. There it followed 11 Mile Road south to M-60 in Burlington. Since the original transfer, all of M-311 north of I-94 was returned to Calhoun County control. This eliminated the section that made a "U-turn". Since December 2009, the highway has been signed in the field.

Major intersections

See also

References

External links 

M-311 at Michigan Highways
 Rationalization process at Michigan Highways
M-311 at CanHighways.com

311
Transportation in Calhoun County, Michigan